Historically Speaking is a reissue of an August 27, 1951 recording by baritone saxophonist Gerry Mulligan that was released as Prestige 7251.

The album was originally reissued on 12-inch LP as Mulligan Plays Mulligan on Prestige 7006 after originally being released as a 10- inch LP in 1951

Track listing 
"Funhouse" (3:12)
"Ide's Side" (3:19)
"Roundhouse" (3:32)
"Kaper" (3:09)
"Bweebida Bobbida" (2:59)
"Mullenium" (4:06)
"Mulligan's Too" (17:36)

Personnel
Gerry Mulligan – baritone saxophone
Max McElroy – baritone saxophone (track 1–6)
Allen Eager – tenor saxophone
George Wallington – piano
 and Nick Travis – trumpet (track 1–6)
Ollie Wilson – trombone (track 1–6)
Phil Leshin – double-bass
Walter Bolden – drums
Gail Madden – maracas

References

1951 albums
Prestige Records albums
Gerry Mulligan albums
Cool jazz albums